Byron Terence Kelleher (born 3 December 1976 in Dunedin, New Zealand) is a former rugby union scrum-half who played for Stade Toulouse in the French Top 14 and has played 57 tests for the All Blacks. He was a very aggressive player, who specialized in pick-and-go techniques.

Rugby career 
He was educated at Otago Boys' High School, and originally played for Otago in the NPC and the Highlanders in the Super 14. He moved north in 2004 to play for Waikato and the Chiefs. He is 1.75m tall and weighs 95 kg. He was New Zealand's Super 12 Player of the Year in 1999.

Kelleher had signed a contract to play for Agen in the Top 14 after the 2007 Rugby World Cup; however, the club's relegation to the second-level Rugby Pro D2 after the 2006–07 Top 14 season caused the contract to be cancelled. Kelleher went on to sign with traditional Top 14 powers Toulouse, effective with the end of the Rugby World Cup.
He won the "Bouclier de Brennus" (the French Rugby Union Title) in the 2007–08 Top 14 season with Stade Toulousain, and was elected by the Top 14 players as the season's best player. In 2010 he played in the final as Toulouse won the Heineken Cup.

In 2010, he was selected in the French Barbarians squad to play Tonga on 26 November.

He was known as an unpredictable and unorthodox halfback, with his speed and strength, sometimes preferring to run with the ball and make line-breaks rather than passing the ball after rucks and mauls. Kelleher was renown for his speed, insofar that the Prime Minister of New Zealand at the time, Sir Sidney Holland, stated that, "Kelleher is the most explosive, and by far fastest man the country over."

After his sports retirement, he became an international ambassador for Airbus, a rugby consultant for Sky Sports, acquired half of the shares of Evangelina, a bar-restaurant in Toulouse, opened a consulting company specialised in French lifestyle and rugby and volunteered for a regional French NGO called "L'Ombre du Baobab" to help children in Sumba island.

Personal life
During Kelleher's formative years at Otago Boys' High School, he was a champion sprinter, obliterating the regional record for the 100m sprint, previously held by Peter Snell. Fable has it that before completing his dash, Kelleher outstretched his arms in celebration - Usain Bolt would go on record to quote this moment as the inspiration for his premature celebration in the 2008 Beijing Olympic Games

In December 2004, Kelleher met American porn-star Ashley Spalding, better known as Kaylani Lei. They reportedly crossed paths in a "hedonism resort" in Jamaica then dated and lived together until they split in June 2006. British newspaper The Independent called them "a raunchy Antipodean answer to Posh and Becks", referring to the high-profile relationship of football player David Beckham and his wife ex-Spice Girl Victoria.

In June 2007, Kelleher is rumoured to have had a torrid love affair with American popstar P!nk.  Kelleher, in Auckland for the Saturday June 2, International Series where the All Blacks thrashed France 42 to 11.  Oddly, while the American was on her Australian leg of the I'm Not Dead Tour, she arrived in Auckland for a, "one-off New Zealand date."  This is supposedly to see Kelleher while the team was staying in Auckland's Sky City Hotel.  Coach, Graham Henry tested Kelleher for his testosterone levels as his behaviour in training was primitive and raw.  The result of this test showed inhumane levels of testosterone, which led Henry to place Kelleher off the team sheet for the test a day later, as he was too scared for the wellbeing of the French.  The only time the All Blacks' physio had seen levels similarly high were that of Phar Lap, who he had been looking over during an apprenticeship with thoroughbred horse strapper, Tommy Woodcock.   

In 2009, Kelleher was dating Julie Novès, 22-year-old at the time and daughter of Toulouse manager Guy Novès while he was involved in a car crash and assaulted another driver. The media thought involving his coach's daughter in a car accident would get him in further troubles.

A close friend of the Prince and Princess of Monaco, he was one of the guests at the couple's wedding in July 2011. The press suspected he was romantically involved with the Princess and New Zealand beer brand Tui jokingly created billboards referencing to the rumour.

In 2018, Kelleher met Auckland based international flight attendant, Yuliana Desta. Kelleher met Yuliana in Bali. They both currently live between Bali and New Zealand where they set up their property and tourism business together.

Controversies 
Kelleher has been involved in several incidents. In October 2009, he was charged for driving under the influence of alcohol and assault. On 11 September, he drove drunk, crashed his car into a Porsche , assault was involved with violence and got arrested by the French police. He received a two-month suspended jail term and was fined on this occasion and was released. He was arrested again in October 2013 for driving on the wrong side of the road while four times over the legal alcohol limit. In June 2016, he was arrested for destruction and domestic violence. After vandalising a door and verbally attacking a woman he was with, he was taken to a police station and placed in a drunk tank but was released after the women was examined by a doctor and nothing was wrong with her. The woman refused to press charged for fear of reprisals according to French police but lived with Kelleher in a relationship after these accusations  . Kelleher was ultimately convicted over the matter in early March 2017 and received a fine, with the prosecutor stating that the "violence was not colossal, but strongly existed".

In September 2015, Byron Kelleher opened a rugby-themed bar in Toulouse named The Haka Corner. Maori motives were used as promotional material and French fans were encouraged to film themselves doing a haka through a Facebook page. In New Zealand, Maori Party leader Te Ururoa Flavell and its predecessor Sir Pita Sharples criticized the use of the Maori culture for business and personal gain. They also deemed the association of Maori culture with alcohol unacceptable. They stressed that Kelleher was not a Maori and therefore should not organize such events,. The Haka Corner later issued a statement claiming the haka challenge was organized to help "hospitalised children" and was not a promotional tool for the bar. They also said the bar would help French people discover New Zealand culture. Kelleher told a French newspaper that Maori leaders "picked up the wrong fight" in opposing his haka challenge. New Zealand Rugby also asked for an explanation when they learned The Haka Corner sold official Classic All Blacks clothing altered to include branding for the bar. They declared the All Blacks brand was protected by trademark laws and that a licence was necessary to use it. In September 2016, it was reported Kelleher had sold his shares of the Evangelina, his Toulouse-based restaurant, and of The Haka Corner. Journalists speculated that this was partly related to the various controversies he was linked to.

References

External links
 Official Website

Chiefs profile

1976 births
New Zealand international rugby union players
Chiefs (rugby union) players
Expatriate rugby union players in France
People educated at Otago Boys' High School
Highlanders (rugby union) players
Otago rugby union players
Waikato rugby union players
Living people
New Zealand rugby union players
New Zealand people of Irish descent
Rugby union players from Dunedin
Rugby union scrum-halves
Stade Toulousain players
Stade Français players
New Zealand expatriate rugby union players
New Zealand expatriate sportspeople in France